Samuel Kelly Brown (born October 26, 1981) is an American comedian, actor, and writer. He is best known as a member of the sketch comedy troupe The Whitest Kids U' Know, founded by Trevor Moore, Zach Cregger, and himself. The troupe had their own show on IFC, which ran for five seasons.

Early life and education
While attending Sandwich High School, Brown made a movie for his calculus class as part of a group. Following through with his passion, Brown enrolled at the School of Visual Arts in Manhattan.

Career
While working New York City comedy clubs, he met Trevor Moore, who also attended SVA and lived in the same dormitory. The two decided to start a comedy troupe, joined shortly thereafter by mutual friend Zach Cregger. It was in that first semester in college that they created the Whitest Kids U’ Know. Brown since then has graduated with a BFA in film from SVA, and has served as an associate producer at ImaginAsianTV. Brown, Moore, and Cregger were later joined by Timmy Williams and Darren Trumeter. In the commentary of The Whitest Kids U' Know season one DVD, the rest of the troupe jokingly state their hate for Brown because he was late the day they were recording the commentary.

In 2008, Brown and Williams guest-starred in an episode of the Adult Swim series Fat Guy Stuck in Internet. In 2019, Brown voiced Manny and Schmaaron in the Netflix series Twelve Forever. In 2021, Brown worked on the Cartoon Network series Tig n' Seek as a writer.

References

External links

1981 births
Living people
American male comedians
21st-century American comedians
American male television actors
American television writers
American male television writers
People from Sandwich, Massachusetts
Screenwriters from Massachusetts
21st-century American screenwriters
21st-century American male writers
21st-century American male actors